Universidad Panamericana Preparatoria (Preparatoria UP or prepaUP) is a private senior high school in Mexico City, affiliated with Universidad Panamericana. It has separate campuses for girls and boys. The Campus Yaocalli (Centro Escolar Yaocalli), for girls, is located in Colonia Miguel Hidalgo, Tlalpan. The boys' campus or the Campus Varonil is in Col. Ex Hacienda Guadalupe Chimalistac in Álvaro Obregón.

References

External links
 Preparatoria." Universidad Panamericana Preparatoria

High schools in Mexico City
Private schools in Mexico
Tlalpan
Álvaro Obregón, Mexico City
Yaocalli es una institución horrible y asquerosa, si quieres meter ahí a tu hija dejamé decirte que la llevas al mismo infierno y al maltrato